SM U-53 was one of the six Type U 51 U-boats of the Imperial German Navy during the First World War.

Construction and commissioning
U-53 was ordered from Germaniawerft, Kiel in 1914 and launched in 1916. She was commissioned under her first commander Hans Rose in 1916.

Service with the Imperial German Navy
Rose's first patrol with U-53 was to Newport, Rhode Island. His mission had been to sink any British warships in position to ambush the merchant submarine Bremen; but he heard a radio broadcast on 28 September 1916 indicating Bremen had been sunk. U-53 entered Newport harbor on the morning of 7 October 1916. Rose paid courtesy visits to Rear Admiral Austin M. Knight, Commandant of the United States Second Naval District, and Rear Admiral Albert Gleaves aboard the cruiser ; and then received courtesy visits from both admirals aboard U-53. Admiral Gleaves brought his wife and daughter to visit U-53. It took the neutral American government about two hours to decide how to handle this surprise visit. When the harbor master started talking about quarantine regulations, Rose returned to sea to avoid being interned.

U-53 commenced military operations the next morning two miles off the Lightship Nantucket. The American steamer  was stopped by a shot across the bow at 0535, and then released when examination of her papers revealed no contraband cargo. A large passenger liner was allowed to pass at 06:00 because Rose felt unable to provide for the safety of a large number of passengers. The 4,321-ton British steamer Strathdene was stopped at 06:53 and torpedoed at 07:43 after the crew had abandoned ship. The 4,224-ton Norwegian steamer Christian Knutsen with a cargo of diesel oil for London was stopped at 08:03 and torpedoed at 0953 after the crew had abandoned ship. The 3,847-ton steamer West Point was stopped at 1130 and sunk by explosive charges after the crew had abandoned ship.

Seventeen American destroyers were dispatched from Newport to search for survivors in response to the Nantucket lightship's reports of sinkings. The destroyers arrived about 1700 as U-53 stopped the Dutch steamer Blommersdyk bound for England with contraband cargo. The 3,449-ton British passenger liner Stephano was stopped and the gathering American destroyers took off its crew and passengers. Rose used his last torpedoes to sink Blommersdyk at 19:50 and Stephano at 22:30. Rose set a homeward course via the Gulf Stream and evaded three British destroyers sent from Canada to intercept him.

Political Ramifications from Trip
There was a great deal of anger amongst the Allied powers after the visit of U-53 to the American port and the subsequent sinking of Allied shipping. While all of the sinkings were done according to Prize court laws and nobody was killed during them, the attacks instilled fear in the British because of the reach of the German U-boats, and the United States because these attacks occurred so close to American shores.

The British were further outraged that most of the attacks occurred while the submarine was surrounded by American destroyers. After a soothing speech by Sir Edward Grey, these complaints were calmed when he pointed out that the American ships had no legal right to interfere with these attacks and had done all they could to rescue the sailors in the water. German newspapers celebrated the trip as a great demonstration of the reach of the German Navy and Captain Rose was praised for his actions.

Career after voyage 
In the summer of 1917 German naval artist Claus Bergen accompanied U-53 on an Atlantic patrol, resulting in a series of well-known paintings.

On 16 August 1917 she sank the SS Athenia built in 1904, the first "Donaldson Line" ship of that name. U-53 torpedoed and sank the Athenia off Inishtrahull. Coincidentally, two decades later, in 1939, a new SS Athenia was sunk by the U-boat U-30 in the same area.

Rose was relieved by Otto von Schrader in 1918. The U-53 operated primarily within the English Channel after this, attacking Allied and neutral vessels. Von Schrader sank ten more ships of 1,782 tons with U-53 before the armistice on 11 November.

U-53 was surrendered to the Allies at Harwich on 1 December 1918 in accordance with the requirements of the Armistice with Germany. She was sold by the British Admiralty to George Cohen on 3 March 1919 for £2,400 (excluding her engines), and was broken up at Swansea.

Summary of raiding history

References

Notes

Citations

Bibliography

External links
Photos of cruises of German submarine U-54 in 1916-1918. Great photo quality, comments in German.
A 44 min. film from 1917 about a cruise of the German submarine U-35. A German propaganda film without dead or wounded; many details about submarine warfare in World War I.

Room 40:  original documents, photos and maps about World War I German submarine warfare and British Room 40 Intelligence from The National Archives, Kew, Richmond, UK.
 National Maritime Museum webpage - Portrait of Commander Rose on the deck of U-53 in the collection of the National Maritime Museum

World War I submarines of Germany
Type U 51 submarines
Ships built in Kiel
1916 ships
U-boats commissioned in 1916